Serene Husseini Shahid (French: Sirine Husseini Shahid; 1920–2008) was born in Jerusalem as  a member of the influential Husayni family. Her father was Jamal al-Husayni (himself a second cousin of the then Grand Mufti of Jerusalem Amin al-Husseini), her maternal grandfather was  Mayor of Jerusalem Faidi al-Alami, and her maternal uncle was Musa al-Alami. She was educated at the Ramallah Friends School in Ramallah, later at the American University of Beirut. 

After 1967 she became involved in starting "cottage industries" among the  Palestinian refugees. She worked on embroidery projects for Palestinian women, conducting embroidery workshops on weekdays. She, together with Huguette Caland, helped found the Association for the Development of Palestinian Camps, a.k.a. "Inaash" (founded 1969)  in Lebanon, an association devoted to preserving Traditional Palestinian Embroidery and helping women and children in Palestinian Refugee Camps in Lebanon.  At the same time she has written about Palestinian costumes and embroidery and helped arrange exhibitions, including one in the Museum of Mankind in the British Museum in 1991. She has also donated items to the Palestine Costume Archive.

She married Munib Shahid, son of a noble family of the Baháʼí Faith, in 1944 and they settled down in Beirut. Her daughter Leila Shahid is Palestinian envoy to European Commission. Her other two daughters, Maya and Zeina, design and promote Palestinian Embroideries for Inaash.

Her autobiography, Jerusalem Memories, was published in 2000, and was critically acclaimed as "breaking new ground". It has been translated into several languages.

Bibliography
Weir, Shelagh and Shahid, Serene:  Palestinian embroidery : cross-stitch patterns from the traditional costumes of the village women of Palestine.  London: British Museum publications, c1988.  
Shahid, Serene Hussein (Editor: Jean Said Makdisi), (Introduction - Edward W. Said):  Jerusalem Memories, Naufal, Beirut, 2000. First Edition.
Jerusalem Passages, (excerpts from Jerusalem Memories), Spring 2000, Issue 8,  Jerusalem Quarterly

See also
Palestinian costumes

References

1920 births
2008 deaths
People from Jerusalem
Palestinian clothing
Palestinian women
Al-Husayni family
Palestinian non-fiction writers
20th-century Palestinian people
Embroiderers